Frew McMillan and Betty Stöve defeated the defending champions John and Tracy Austin in the final, 4–6, 7–6(7–2), 6–3 to win the mixed doubles tennis title at the 1981 Wimbledon Championships.

Seeds

  John Austin /  Tracy Austin (final)
  Frew McMillan /  Betty Stöve (champions)
  Marty Riessen /  Wendy Turnbull (third round)
  n/a
  Mark Edmondson /  Dianne Fromholtz (first round)
  Steve Denton /  Anne Smith (first round)
  Kevin Curren /  Tanya Harford (quarterfinals)
  n/a

Draw

Finals

Top half

Section 1

Section 2

Bottom half

Section 3

Section 4

References

External links

1981 Wimbledon Championships – Doubles draws and results at the International Tennis Federation

X=Mixed Doubles
Wimbledon Championship by year – Mixed doubles